Private Samuel S. French (April 23, 1841 – February 17, 1913) was an American soldier who fought in the American Civil War. French received the country's highest award for bravery during combat, the Medal of Honor, for his action during the Battle of Seven Pines in Virginia on May 31, 1862. He was honored with the award on October 24, 1895.

Biography
French  was born in Erie County, New York, on April 23, 1841. He enlisted into the 7th Michigan Infantry. He died on February 17, 1913, and his remains are interred at the Gilford Cemetery in Michigan.

Medal of Honor citation

See also

List of American Civil War Medal of Honor recipients: A–F

References

1841 births
1913 deaths
People of Michigan in the American Civil War
Union Army officers
United States Army Medal of Honor recipients
American Civil War recipients of the Medal of Honor